South African Football clubs regularly changed their names. Former Premier Soccer League (PSL) Chief Executive Trevor Phillips complained that regular name changes and license buy outs was turning the PSL into a "mumbo-jumbo" league. Clubs in the top-tier were sometimes bought by businessman and renamed to have the same name as a club with previous history. In May 2008, this was partially resolved when governing body FIFA stepped in to prevent clubs purchasing licenses to play in a higher league.

In 2002, the league organisers opted to purchase two clubs; Free State Stars (Qwa-Qwa) and Ria Stars (Polokwane) and dissolve them to reduce fixture congestion. Each club was purchased for R8million. Free State Stars were originally known as Qwa Qwa Stars. Another club known as Free State Stars F.C. has been established since. The owner of the original Free State Stars purchased a club in the lower divisions Maholosiane and renamed it to Free State Stars.

The club Dynamos sold their PSL license to AmaZulu who were formerly known as Zulu Royals in 2006. A new team known as Dyanmos F.C. was established in the wake of the sale in a lower division.

Tembisa Classic sold their PSL license to Maritzburg United

Wits University renamed their Premier Soccer League team to Bidvest Wits in time for the 2006–07 season. Bidvest, a major services, distribution and trading company sponsored the club for several seasons before purchasing naming rights to the club.

References 

 
Name changes